The Battle of Xicheng was a military conflict between the Yehe Jurchens, their Ming allies, and the Later Jin. In the fall of 1619 Nurhaci invaded Xicheng, the home of the Yehe Jurchens. Nurhaci personally led the vanguard and took the east wall. After capturing the city the Yehe inhabitants were spared, but their Ming allies who had fought beside them were executed.

References

Bibliography

1619 in China
Xicheng 1619
Xicheng 1619